The Sonder Kfz-1 and SK-1, also known as Garant 30k SK-1, was an East German armored patrol vehicle introduced by the East German Police in 1953. It was used by the Kasernierte Volkspolizei (KVP, Riot Police) and for a short time by the National People's Army. The SK-1 is the chassis of a Robur Garant 30K truck fitted with an armored body and a light turret. There is a door in the rear of the hull for the crew to enter, and a hatch on top of the turret. The turret has several vision slits and a hole for a machinegun. With the reunification of Germany, most of the SK-1s were scrapped, except for some sent to museums or private collectors.

Specifications
 Fuel Type Diesel, A
 Load 300 kg
 Vehicle Weight 5.4 tons
 Crew 2+3
 Fuel Cap 120/48
 Armor 16mm

References

External links

 Picture at Polizeiautos.de

Armoured cars of the Cold War
Armoured fighting vehicles of Germany
Internal security vehicles
Riot control equipment
Military vehicles introduced in the 1950s